Ivan Režić (born 15 September 1979) is a Croatian footballer who plays as a midfielder for Varteks. He made one appearance for the Croatia national team in 2003.

Career
Režić earned his first and only cap for Croatia on 9 February 2003 in a friendly against Macedonia. The home match, which was played in Šibenik, finished as a 2–2 draw.

Career statistics

International

References

External links
 
 
 
 Ivan Režić Interview

1979 births
Living people
Footballers from Split, Croatia
Association football midfielders
Croatian footballers
Croatia international footballers
NK Varaždin players
Inter Milan players
Olympiacos F.C. players
HNK Hajduk Split players
Maccabi Tel Aviv F.C. players
NK Međimurje players
Croatian Football League players
Super League Greece players
Israeli Premier League players
First Football League (Croatia) players
Second Football League (Croatia) players
Croatian expatriate footballers
Croatian expatriate sportspeople in Italy
Expatriate footballers in Italy
Croatian expatriate sportspeople in Greece
Expatriate footballers in Greece
Croatian expatriate sportspeople in Israel
Expatriate footballers in Israel